Eternamente Romanticos is the twenty-seventh studio album by La Mafia released on August 12, 2008. This would be the last studio album La Mafia released until 2014. The album was nominated for a Latin Grammy in 2009.

Track listing

References

2008 albums
La Mafia albums
Spanish-language albums